Leo Edmond Thiffault (December 16, 1944 – July 1, 2018) was a Canadian professional ice hockey player who played five games in the National Hockey League with the Minnesota North Stars during the 1967–68 season, all in the playoffs. Thiffault and Sid McNabney are the only players to play five play-off games in the NHL without playing any regular-season games. He died in 2018 at the age of 73.

Career statistics

Regular season and playoffs

References

External links
 

1944 births
2018 deaths
Canadian ice hockey left wingers
Cleveland Barons (1937–1973) players
Houston Apollos players
Memphis South Stars players
Minnesota North Stars players
Montreal Junior Canadiens players
Peterborough Petes (ice hockey) players
Phoenix Roadrunners (WHL) players
Quebec Aces (AHL) players
Sportspeople from Drummondville
Tulsa Oilers (1964–1984) players